Niceforonia peraccai is a species of frog in the family Strabomantidae that is endemic to Ecuador.
Its natural habitats are subtropical or tropical moist montane forests, subtropical or tropical high-altitude shrubland, and subtropical or tropical high-altitude grassland.
It is threatened by habitat loss.

References

peraccai
Amphibians of Ecuador
Amphibians of the Andes
Endemic fauna of Ecuador
Taxonomy articles created by Polbot
Amphibians described in 1975